The DFL Deutsche Fußball Liga GmbH (or simply Deutsche Fußball Liga; ; often shortened to DFL) is a wholly owned subsidiary of Die Liga – Fußballverband. The DFL is responsible for entire operating business of the Ligaverband, including the Bundesliga and 2. Bundesliga leagues. The chairman of supervisory board of the DFL is Reinhard Rauball. Christian Seifert is CEO of the DFL.

Since 1 July 2001, the DFL has organised the Bundesliga and 2. Bundesliga. From 2005 until 2007, they also organised the DFL-Ligapokal. Since 2010, the DFL also has organised the DFL-Supercup.

Function
The DFL was founded on 19 December 2000 as an independent GmbH. Since then, the Ligaverband has been the sole shareholder of the DFL, which has provided the capital stock in the amount of €1 million. The organisation is a subsidiary of the Ligaverband, which acts as a representative for the 36 professional clubs in the top two leagues of German football. Today the Bundesliga and 2. Bundesliga are operated by the DFL, but jointly hosted by the German Football Association (Deutscher Fußball-Bund, DFB) and the Ligaverband.

Duties
The DFL itself divides its operating business into the areas of operation, licensing, and marketing. The "operations" business area includes, in particular, the management of the licensed players' activities and the organisation of the competitions of the Ligaverband, which includes the Bundesliga, 2. Bundesliga, and DFL-Supercup, along with the promotion/relegation play-offs.

The business area of "marketing" includes the allocation of broadcasting rights and licenses for the leagues on various media platforms, including television, radio, and on the Internet. The Bundesliga broadcasting rights include a total of 209 territories around the world.

The third business area, "licensing", is the implementation and development of the former DFB licensing procedure. The DFL applies the procedure for the clubs of the Bundesliga and the 2. Bundesliga, as well as for some of the clubs of the lower leagues under a business contract. In doing so, the DFL will examine the extent to which the individual clubs fulfill the requirements for participation in the professional football competitions. The list of requirements includes sporting, financial, legal, infrastructural, personnel, administrative, media, and safety-related criteria. Highly important, and to date the only criterion which led to major problems for certain clubs, is the financial criterion. With this criterion the DFL tries to ascertain that all clubs remain solvent during the season in order to be able to maintain the club operations for as long as possible. The DFL can refuse to issue a license if a club does not meet these requirements.

Since 1 September 2012, the new organizational structure of the DFL now sees only two business areas rather than three.

With 23 other national professional league associations, the DFL is founding member of the World Leagues Forum, founded in Zürich in February 2016. The organisation aims, among other things, to centrally combine and represent the interests of the professional leagues and their common views before FIFA and other institutions engaged in sports and politics.

Subsidiaries
 DFL Foundation
 Bundesliga International GmbH (formerly DFL Sports Enterprises GmbH)
 DFL Digital Sports GmbH
 Sportcast GmbH
 HD SAT Communication GmbH
 Livecast TV Produktion GmbH
 Sportec Solutions GmbH
 DFA Deutsches Fußball Archiv GmbH
 Liga Travel GmbH

Bodies
The leadership of the DFL, which includes the CEO and the supervisory, attend the annual shareholders' meeting. Part of the supervisory board of the DFL forms a personal union with the Vorstand of the Ligaverband.

Wilfried Straub was the first CEO of the DFL, serving from 2001 until 2005. In 2005, Christian Seifert became the chief executive. His contract ended 2021. In 2022 Donata Hopfen became the first female CEO of the DFL. In February 2022, she was open to plans to introduce playoffs in the Bundesliga. There is also the idea of ​​holding the Supercup abroad.

References

External links
 

 
1
2000 establishments in Germany

de:DFL Deutsche Fußball Liga#Deutsche Fußball Liga GmbH